Marco Scano (born 25 April 1945) is an Italian boxer. He competed in the men's welterweight event at the 1968 Summer Olympics. At the 1968 Summer Olympics, he lost to Alfonso Ramírez of Mexico.

References

1945 births
Living people
Welterweight boxers
Italian male boxers
Olympic boxers of Italy
Boxers at the 1968 Summer Olympics
Sportspeople from Cagliari
20th-century Italian people